Gardens of the Night is a 2008 drama film, written and directed by Damian Harris and starring Gillian Jacobs, John Malkovich, Ryan Simpkins, and Tom Arnold.

Plot
In Pennsylvania, eight-year-old Leslie Whitehead (Ryan Simpkins) is kidnapped by Alex (Tom Arnold) and Frank (Kevin Zegers). Alex says he needs help finding his dog, then he and Frank take her to school. While driving, Alex tells Leslie her dad is their boss, thus gaining her trust. After school, Alex and Frank find her again. They lure her into their car with a story about her dad being in trouble, then drug her and take her to their house. They tell Leslie her parents do not want her anymore. As proof, Alex provides the number to her "dad's cell phone", which is actually a payphone. After multiple unanswered calls, she eventually accepts their story.

She and another victim, a young boy named Donnie, are sexually abused and used for child pornography. Their clients include men in positions of authority, such as a judge. As a coping mechanism, Donnie and Leslie pretend they are in an imaginary world based on the stories of Mowgli from The Jungle Book. One day, Leslie, Donnie, Alex, and Frank go to a convenience store, where it becomes apparent Leslie's parents are looking for her because her picture is on milk cartons; however, Leslie does not see them. While Alex is paying for ice cream, the store owner's wife recognizes Leslie as missing and calls the police. When the police show up at Alex and Frank's house, they escape with the children.

Almost nine years later, Leslie (Gillian Jacobs) and Donnie (Evan Ross) are living together on the streets of San Diego, prostituting themselves and stealing. Ostensibly as a way for her to get off the streets, a pimp named Cooper (Shiloh Fernandez) tries to convince Leslie to lure a twelve-year-old girl, Monica, living at a youth shelter into prostitution. Meanwhile, Donnie has fallen in love with Leslie, but she is unsure how to feel because, presumably, she has always just seen him as her brother. She ends up deciding to leave Donnie and goes to the shelter to "turn out" the girl. When Donnie goes looking for Leslie, Cooper tells him she has left him while leading into a fistfight, devastating him. At the last minute, Leslie decides not to turn out Monica and returns her to the shelter. She tries to go back to Donnie, but finds out he has left town without saying where he was going. Having no other choice, Leslie goes back to the shelter to stay. A counselor there (John Malkovich) discovers Leslie is a missing person and tells her her parents have been looking for her all these years, which she finally realizes is true.

Leslie reunites with her parents, along with two siblings born during her absence, and attempts to "return home". However, she is too traumatized after all she has been through and cannot remain in such a normal atmosphere. She leaves in the middle of the night and starts to hitchhike, hoping to find Donnie again. Donnie is shown hitchhiking through Florida, the location of an amusement park where he and Leslie, as young children, promised they would meet if they ever got separated.

Cast
 Gillian Jacobs as Leslie Whitehead
 Ryan Simpkins as Young Leslie Whitehead
 Tom Arnold as Alex
 Evan Ross as Donnie
 Jermaine "Scooter" Smith as Young Donnie
 John Malkovich as Michael
 Kevin Zegers as Frank
 Michelle Rodriguez as Lucy
 Jeremy Sisto as Jimmy
 Peta Wilson as Sarah
 Shiloh Fernandez as Cooper
 Harold Perrineau as Orlando
 Troy Rubtash as John "Motel John"
 Raynold Gideon as Judge Feeney
 Cornelia Guest as Mrs. Feeney
 Natalie May as Miss Feeney
 Ben Lin as Pa
 Alice Lo as Ma
 Landall Goolsby as John "Blackberry John"
 Shontea Saldana as "Baby Loco"
 Max Van Ville as Surf
 Kyle Gallner as Rat Boy
 Angel Lacy as The Waitress
 Evan Peters as Rachel / Brian
 Carlie Westman as Monica
 Jeff Swarthout as John "Gay John"
 Jeff Feringa as Booster Lady
 Jim Cody Williams as Leslie's John
 Alexis Jackson as Mia
 Raphael Sbarge as Mr. Whitehead
 Lisa Akey as Mrs. Whitehead
 Gracie Sbarge as Gracie Whitehead
 Ty Simpkins as Dylan Whitehead

Reception

Commercial
The film was first screened at the Berlin International Film Festival in February 2008, where it was nominated for, but did not win the Golden Bear Award.

The film was then released in the UK and France in October 2008, and in November 2008 was given limited release in New York City. It has never had a nationwide release in the United States.

Critical
, Gardens of the Night holds a 57% approval rating on the review aggregator Rotten Tomatoes, based on 14 reviews with an average rating of 5.82/10.

A review in The New York Times states, "Recovery time is recommended after seeing Gardens of the Night, a harrowing, obliquely told story of kidnapping and forced child prostitution that conjures a world entirely populated by predators and prey."

A review in the New York Observer calls the film "another newfangled kind of horror movie", going on to say, "It is hard to watch, but worth every sobering moment because of the things you learn about one of life’s most grueling subjects."

Tom Arnold's performance was praised by many critics including Leslie Felperin of Variety who said "Tom Arnold steals the show".

Awards
Gardens of the Night won the International Critics Jury award at the 2008 Deauville Festival of American Film.  It also won the "Coup de Coeur" of the International Competition and the CinéFemme Award at the Mons (Belgium) International Love Film Festival.

The film won the 2008 Audience Award at the Lyon Film festival (Lyfe/ Hors-Ecran).

Prism Awards: Nominated as Best Feature Film (Mental Health).

References

External links
 
 
 
 

2008 films
2008 drama films
American drama films
Films about child abduction in the United States
Films about child abuse
Films about prostitution in the United States
2000s English-language films
Films directed by Damian Harris
2000s American films